"Yes, Virginia, there is a Santa Claus" is a line from an editorial by Francis Pharcellus Church titled "Is There a Santa Claus?", which appeared in the New York newspaper The Sun on September 21, 1897, and became one of the most famous editorials ever published. Written in response to a letter by eight-year-old Virginia O'Hanlon asking whether Santa Claus was real, the editorial was initially published anonymously and Church's authorship was not disclosed until after his 1906 death. As the editorial became popular over the years, The Sun began republishing it during the Christmas season, including every year from 1924 to 1950, when the paper ceased publication.

"Is There a Santa Claus?" is widely reprinted during the Christmas and holiday season and has been cited as the most reprinted newspaper editorial in the English language. It has been translated into around 20 languages and adapted as a film, television presentations, a musical, and a cantata.

Background

Francis Pharcellus Church 
Francis Pharcellus Church (February 22, 1839April 11, 1906) was an American publisher and editor. He and his brother William Conant Church founded and edited several publications: The Army and Navy Journal  in 1863, The Galaxy (1866), and the Internal Revenue Record and Customs Journal (1870). Before the outbreak of the American Civil War he had worked in journalism, first at his father's New-York Chronicle and later at the New York newspaper The Sun. Church left The Sun in the early 1860s but returned to work there part-time in 1874. After The Galaxy merged with The Atlantic Monthly in 1878 he joined The Sun's staff full-time as an editor and writer. Church wrote thousands of editorials at the paper, and became known for his writing on religious topics from a secular point of view. After Church's death, his friend J. R. Duryee wrote that Church "by nature and training was reticent about himself, highly sensitive and retiring".

The Sun 
In 1897, The Sun was one of the most prominent newspapers in New York City, having been developed by its long-time editor, Charles Anderson Dana, over the previous thirty years. Their editorials that year were described by scholar W. Joseph Campbell as favoring "vituperation and personal attack". Campbell also wrote that the paper was reluctant to republish content.

Writing and publication 

In 1897, Philip O'Hanlon, a surgeon, was asked by his eight-year-old daughter, Virginia O'Hanlon, whether Santa Claus existed. His answer did not convince her, and Virginia decided to pose the question to The Sun. Sources conflict over whether her father suggested writing the letter, or she elected to on her own. In her letter Virginia wrote that her father had told her "If you see it in The Sun it's so." O'Hanlon later told The Sun that her father thought the newspaper would be "too busy" to respond to her question and had said to "[w]rite if you want to," but not to be disappointed if she did not get a response. 

After sending the letter she looked for, but did not expect, a response "[d]ay after day". O'Hanlon later said that she had waited for an answer to her letter for long enough that she forgot about it. Campbell theorizes the letter was sent shortly after O'Hanlon's birthday in July and was "overlooked or misplaced" for a time. The Sun editor-in-chief, Edward Page Mitchell, eventually gave the letter to Francis Church. Mitchell reported that Church, who was initially reluctant to write a response, produced it "in a short time" during an afternoon.

Church's response was 416 words long and was anonymously published in The Sun on September 21, 1897, shortly after the beginning of the school year in New York City. The editorial appeared in the paper's third and last column of editorials that day, positioned below discussions of topics including an election law in Connecticut, a newly invented chainless bicycle, and "British Ships in American Waters". 

Church was not disclosed as the editorial's author until after his 1906 death. This sometimes led to inaccuracies: a republication in December 1897 by The Meriden Weekly Republican had attributed authorship to Dana, saying that the editorial could "hardly have been written" by any other employee of the paper. The editorial is one of two whose authorship The Sun disclosed; the other being Harold M. Anderson's "[Charles] Lindbergh Flies Alone". Campbell argued in 2006 that Church might not have welcomed The Sun's disclosure, noting that he had generally been unwilling to disclose the authorship of editorials.

Summary 
The editorial, as it first appeared in The Sun, was prefaced with the text of O'Hanlon's letter asking the paper to tell her the truth; "is there a Santa Claus?" O'Hanlon wrote that some of her "little friends" had told her that Santa Claus was not real. Church's response began: "Virginia, your little friends are wrong. They have been affected by the skepticism of a skeptical age." He continued to write that Santa Claus existed "as certainly as love and generosity and devotion exist" and that the world would be "dreary" if he did not. Church argued that just because something could not be seen did not mean it was not real: "Nobody can conceive or imagine all the wonders there are unseen and unseeable in the world." He concluded that:

Initial reception 
Virginia O'Hanlon was informed of the editorial from a friend who called her father, describing the editorial as "the most wonderful piece of writing I ever saw." She later told The Sun  "I think that I have never been so happy in my life" as when she read Church's response. O'Hanlon continued to say that while she was initially very proud of her role in the editorial's publication, she eventually came to understand that "the important thing was" Church's writing. In an interview later in life she credited it with shaping the direction of her life positively. 

The Sun's editor, Charles Anderson Dana, favorably received Church's editorial, deeming it "[r]eal literature". He also said that it "[m]ight be a good idea to reprint [the editorial] every Christmasyes, and even tell who wrote it!" The editorial's publication drew no commentary from contemporary New York newspapers.

Later republication 
While The Sun did not republish the editorial for five years, it soon appeared in other papers. The Sun only republished the editorial after a number of reader requests. After 1902 it did not appear in the paper again until 1906, shortly after Church's death. The paper began to re-publish the editorial more regularly after this, including six times in the ensuing ten years and, according to Campbell, gradually began to "warm to" the editorial. During this period other newspapers began to republish the editorial. 

In 1918 The Sun wrote that they got many requests to "reprint again the Santa Claus editorial article" every Christmas season. The paper would also mail readers copies of the editorial upon request; it received 163,840 requests in 1930 alone and by 1936 had sent 200,000 copies out. Virginia O'Hanlon also received mail about her letter until her 1971 death and would include a copy of the editorial in her replies.The Sun started reprinting the editorial annually at Christmas after 1924, when the paper's editor-in-chief, Frank Munsey, placed it as the first editorial on December 23. This practice continued on the 23rd or 24th of the month until the paper's bankruptcy in 1950. 

"Is There a Santa Claus?" often appears in newspaper editorial sections during the Christmas and holiday season. It has become the most reprinted editorial in any newspaper in the English language, and has been translated into around 20 languages. Campbell describes it as living on as "enduring inspiration in American journalism." Journalist David W. Dunlap described "Yes, Virginia, there is a Santa Claus" as one of the most famous lines in American journalism, placing it after "Headless body in topless bar" and "Dewey Defeats Truman". William David Sloan, a journalism scholar, described the line as "perhaps America's most famous editorial quote" and the editorial as  "the nation's best known."

Adaptations and legacy
A book based on the editorial, Is There a Santa Claus?, was published in 1921. The editorial became better known with the rise of mass media. The story of Virginia's inquiry and The Suns response was adapted in 1932 into an NBC-produced cantata, making it the only known editorial set to classical music. In the 1940s it was read yearly by actress Fay Bainter over the radio. The editorial has been adapted to film several times, including as a segment of the short film Santa Claus Story (1945). Elizabeth Press published a children's book in 1972 titled Yes, Virginia that illustrated the editorial and included a brief history of the main characters. In 1974, a highly fictionalized animated television special titled Yes, Virginia, There Is a Santa Claus, aired on ABC. It was animated by Bill Melendez  and won the 1975 Emmy Award for outstanding children's special.  A 1991 live action television film with the same title, starring Richard Thomas, Ed Asner, and Charles Bronson, was also based on the letter. In 1996, the story was adapted into an eponymous holiday musical by David Kirchenbaum (music and lyrics) and Myles McDonnel (book).

A copy of the letter, hand-written by Virginia and believed by her family to be the original and returned to them by the newspaper was authenticated in 1998 by Kathleen Guzman, an appraiser on the television program Antiques Roadshow. In 2007, the show appraised its value at around $50,000.  the letter was held by Virginia's great-granddaughter.

A 2009 animated television special titled Yes, Virginia, aired on CBS and featured actors including Neil Patrick Harris and Beatrice Miller. The special was written by the Macy's ad agency as part of their "Believe" Make-A-Wish fundraising campaign. In 2010 a book was written based upon the special. Two years later, Macy's had the special adapted into a musical for students in third through sixth grade. The company gave schools the right to perform the musical for free and gave 100 schools $1,000 grants for performing the musical.

In 2003, "Yes, Virginia, there is a Santa Claus" was depicted in a mechanical holiday window display at the Lord & Taylor flagship store on Fifth Avenue in Manhattan. In December 2015, Macy's Herald Square in New York City used Virginia's story for their holiday window display, illustrated in three-dimensional figurines and spanning several windows on the south side of the store along 34th Street between 6th and 7th Avenues. Macy's based their depiction on the 2009 television special.

The phrase "Yes, Virginia, there is (a)..." has often been used to emphasize that "fantasies and myths are important" and can be "spiritually if not literally true".

Analysis 
The historian and journalist Bill Kovarik described the editorial as part of a broader "revival of the Christmas holiday" that took place during the late 19th century with the publication of various works such as Thomas Nast's art. Scholar Stephen Nissenbaum wrote that the editorial echoed theology common in the late Victorian era and that its content was similar to the content found in sermons of the day. 

The editorial's success has been used to offer insights to writing.  Upon the centenary of the editorial's publication in 1997, the journalist Eric Newton, who at the time was working at the Newseum, described the editorial as representative of the sort of "poetry" that newspapers should publish as editorials, while Geo Beach in the Editor & Publisher trade magazine described Church's writing as "brave" and showing that "love, hope, belief—all have a place on the editorial page". Beach also wrote that newspapers should not hold "anything back", as The Sun had  done by publishing the editorial in September rather than in the Christmas season. In 2005, Campbell wrote that the editorial, particularly The Sun reluctance to republish it, could offer insight into the broader state of American newspapers in the late 19th century.

Reception of the editorial has not been unanimously positive. As early as 1935, journalist Heywood Broun criticized the editorial as a "phony piece of writing." In 1997, the journalist Rick Horowitz wrote in the St. Louis Post-Dispatch that the editorial gave journalists an excuse to not write their own essays around Christmas: "they can just slap Francis Church's 'Yes, Virginia,' up there on the page and go straight to the office party." The editorial came under attack in 1951 by members of the Christian Reformed Church in North America in Lynden, Washington, who criticized it for encouraging Virginia to think of her friends as liars.

See also 
 List of Christmas-themed literature

Notes

References

Bibliography

External links

 Full text of the editorial with digital image from the original newspaper. From the Newseum, Washington, DC
 
 WNYC New York December 1937 radio interview with Virginia O'Hanlon Douglas
 WNBC-TV New York News Reporter Gabe Pressman's annual Christmas Eve report on Yes, Virginia There Is A Santa Claus, 12/24/2011

1897 in the United States
1897 documents
Christmas television specials
Quotations from literature
Santa Claus
Santa Claus in fiction
Christmas essays
1890s neologisms
Christmas in New York (state)
Opinion journalism